Boris Trajkovski (GCMG) (pronounced ; 25 June 1956 – 26 February 2004) was a Macedonian politician who served as the second President of Macedonia from 1999 until his death in 2004 in a plane crash. 

Trajkovski was born into a Methodist family. His father, Kiro, who died in September 2008, was a landworker who had served in the Bulgarian Army and had been imprisoned for two years for feeding prisoners of war. Trajkovski graduated in 1980 with a degree in law from the Ss. Cyril and Methodius University in Skopje. He subsequently specialized in commercial and employment law and made several visits to the United States, where he studied theology to become a Methodist lay minister.

After he finished his studies, the communist government confined him for a time to a remote village because of his religious activities. There he took care of Kočani, an impoverished partly Romani congregation of the United Methodist Church of Macedonia, connected to the United States' United Methodist Church. Following political liberalisation in the 1980s, he went on to head the legal department of the Sloboda construction company in Skopje. He served as Methodist youth secretary in the former Yugoslavia for over 12 years. Later he was President of the Church Council of the Macedonian Evangelical Methodist Church. From 1988 he took part in the ongoing Youth Exchange programme between the Methodist Church of Macedonia and the Berkhamsted and Hemel Hempstead Methodist Circuit in England.  In 1991, he studied English at a Christian language college in Bournemouth, England.

Career in politics 

Trajkovski became active in politics following the Republic of Macedonia's declaration of independence from Yugoslavia in November 1991, when he joined the VMRO-DPMNE party. He played an important role in developing the party's relations with other European political parties and was appointed Chairman of the party's Foreign Relations Commission. In 1997, he became the Chief of Staff of the Mayor of Kisela Voda, a municipality in Skopje. He was appointed Deputy Minister of Foreign Affairs on 21 December 1998 but served in this post for less than a year.

Largely because of his reputation as a moderate reformist, Trajkovski was selected as VMRO-DPMNE's candidate for president in the November 1999 election held to replace the outgoing president, Kiro Gligorov. In the presidential election of 14 November 1999, Trajkovski defeated Tito Petkovski by 52% to 45%. He was scheduled to take office just five days later, on 19 November, but because the results were disputed, parliamentary chairman Savo Klimovski became acting president until Petkovski's supporters lost their last appeal a month later.

Trajkovski's term was marked by tensions between ethnic Macedonians and the republic's large ethnic Albanian minority. The aftermath of the Kosovo War led to months of violent armed clashes between Macedonian security forces and Albanian rebels seeking improvements on their status as a legitimate minority and generally better economical, administrative and legal conditions. Although his powers were limited and his role largely ceremonial, he presided over a NATO-brokered peace deal in 2001 that ended the violence and prevented a full-blown civil war in the Republic of Macedonia. He was seen as a moderate in the ethnic dialogue, arguing for greater inclusion of ethnic Albanians, and has been credited with being a key figure in resolving the conflict. Boris Trajkovski's friend and advisor was his chief of staff Zoran Jolevski, who was the Macedonian Ambassador in the United States of America and the negotiator of the state name in the Macedonia name dispute.

In 2002, he was made an honorary Knight Grand Cross of the Order of St Michael and St George by Queen Elizabeth II.

In 2002, Trajkovski was awarded the World Methodist Peace Award by the World Methodist Council for his role in promoting peace and political stability.

Death 

Trajkovski died on 26 February 2004 in a plane crash en route to an economic conference in Mostar, Bosnia and Herzegovina. The aircraft crashed in thick fog and heavy rain on a mountainside in southeastern Herzegovina, near the villages of Poplat and Vrsnik some eight miles (15 km) south-south-east of Mostar. He is the only President of North Macedonia to die in office.

Eight other people were also aboard but none survived the impact, which broke the aircraft into three pieces. It came down in an area that had been heavily mined during the Bosnian War of the 1990s, which significantly hampered the rescue and recovery efforts; being difficult to handle, and as the runway is not equipped with precision landing systems, it is especially challenging in bad weather. The crash is not the first major air accident to kill a politician in southern Herzegovina: on 3 April 1996, the United States Secretary of Commerce Ronald Brown was killed while en route from Bosnia to Croatia.

After his death there was a state funeral in his honour and on his gravestone is the verse from the Bible "Blessed are the peacemakers for they shall be called the sons of God."

After his death his family continue his legacy through the Boris Trajkovski Foundation.

Awards and recognitions 

  Order of Merit of the Republic of Hungary-Grand Cross with chain 
  Grand Cross of the Order of Merit of the Republic of Poland
  Honorary Knight Grand Cross of the Order of St.Michael and St. George
 World Methodist Council - Peace Award for 2002

References

External links

 Official website of the President of Macedonia
 The Boris Trajkovski International Foundation
 The Evangelical Methodist Church of Macedonia
 Ley Hill Methodist Church website – see their History page

1956 births
2004 deaths
People from Strumica Municipality
Presidents of North Macedonia
Victims of aviation accidents or incidents in Bosnia and Herzegovina
Victims of aviation accidents or incidents in 2004
State leaders killed in aviation accidents or incidents
Methodist ministers
Macedonian Methodists
VMRO-DPMNE politicians
Ss. Cyril and Methodius University of Skopje alumni
Honorary Knights Grand Cross of the Order of St Michael and St George